Albert Henry Ottenweller (April 5, 1916 – September 23, 2012) was an American prelate of the Roman Catholic Church. He served as the second bishop of the Diocese of Steubenville in Ohio from 1977 to 1992.  He previously served as an auxiliary bishop of the Diocese of Toledo in Ohio from 1974 to 1977.

Biography

Early life 
Albert Ottenweller was born in Stanford, Montana, to Charles and Mary (née Hake) Ottenweller. At age six, his family moved to Leipsic, Ohio,, where he attended the parochial school of St. Mary's Parish. He then attended St. Joseph's High School and St. Joseph's College, both in Rensselaer, Indiana. Ottenweller continued his studies at the Catholic University of America in Washington, D.C., where he earned a Licentiate of Sacred Theology in 1943.

Priesthood 

Ottenweller was ordained to the priesthood for the Diocese of Toledo by Bishop Karl Alter on June 19, 1943. After his ordination, Ottenweller had the following parish assignments in Ohio:

 Curate at St. John's in Delphos (1943 - 1959) 
 Curate at St. Richard's in Swanton (1959 – 1961) 
 Pastor of  St. Joseph's Parish in Blakeslee (1961 to 1962)
 Pastor of Our Lady of Mount Carmel in Bono (1962 – 1968)
 Pastor of St. John's in Delphos (1968 – 1976) 
 Pastor of St. Michael's in Findlay (1976 – 1977)

In addition to his pastoral duties, Ottenweller served as director of the Spanish Apostolate (1958 – 1969) and was named vicar general of the diocese in 1968.

Auxiliary Bishop of Toledo 
On April 17, 1974, Pope Paul VI appointed Ottenweller as an auxiliary bishop of the Diocese of Toledo and the titular bishop of Perdices. He was consecrated by Bishop John Donovan on May 29, 1974.  Ottenweller served as head of the USCCB Committee on the Laity from 1978 to 1981.

Bishop of Steubenville 
Ottenweller was appointed bishop of the Diocese of Steubenville on September 27, 1977 by Pope Paul VI. He was installed on November 22, 1977.

In 1989, Ottenweller was arrested with other protestors outside a women's health clinic that provided abortion services in Youngstown, Ohio.  Refusing to post bail, he spent six days in jail before his trial.

Retirement and legacy 
On January 28, 1992, Pope John Paul II accepted Ottenweller's resignation as bishop of Steubenville. After his resignation, he moved back to Toledo.  He helped establish the Center for Servant Leadership, an institution in Toledo to support individual development.

Albert Ottenweller died on September 23, 2012 at the Ursuline Center in Toledo after a brief illness.

See also
Steubenville Diocese
Roman Catholic Diocese of Toledo

External links
Catholic-Hierarchy
Steubenville Diocese

Notes

20th-century Roman Catholic bishops in the United States
Roman Catholic bishops of Steubenville
1916 births
2012 deaths
Catholic University of America alumni
People from Judith Basin County, Montana
Roman Catholic Diocese of Toledo
People from Leipsic, Ohio
Catholics from Montana